Lee Sang-Mook (born October 18, 1962) is a Korean marine geologist and computational scientist. He has worked as a researcher at the Korean Ocean Research and Development Institute from 1998 to 2003, and as a professor and researcher at Seoul National University since 2003.
As an associate professor in the School of Earth and Environmental Sciences, he specializes in Marine Geology and Geophysics. He heads the Undergraduate Interdisciplinary Program in Computational Sciences and the graduate program in Computational Science and Technology.

His research focuses on tectonic plates, underwater earthquakes, and volcanoes. He has advocated successfully at the national level for the use of Korean survey ships for basic scientific research.

After being injured in a car accident on July 2, 2006, Dr. Lee became a quadriplegic.  He was able to return to work in less than a year, and continues to teach, do research, and travel.
He has helped in the development of assistive technologies such as the DOWELL smartphone program by Samsung.

He is an advocate for the education of students with physical disabilities, and has introduced a “Calculative science collaboration major” focusing on the use of supercomputers, mathematics and digital modeling techniques, suitable for disabled science students. Lee served as Chair of the Preparation Committee of the "PyeongChang Forum for the Earth and its Citizens" prior to the 2018 Winter Olympics in PyeongChang.

Education 
 1985, B.S., Seoul National University, College of Natural Sciences, Dept of Oceanography
 1995, Ph.D., Massachusetts Institute of Technology/Woods Hole Oceanographic Institution, Joint Program in Oceanography/Applied Ocean Science and Engineering
 1996–1998, Post-doctoral Research, Department of Geological Sciences, University of Durham, England

Awards 
 2008 Commendation (Certificate of Honor), The Board of Supervisors of the City and County of San Francisco
 2009 Medal of Merit, Republic of Korea
 2010 2010 DO-IT Trailblazer Award, DO-IT Center, University of Washington
 2011 Grand Prize, Seoul City Welfare Award

Research Area 
 Oceanography, Marine Geology and Geophysics, Geodynamics, Plate Tectonics, High-resolution Investigation of Deep Sea, Underwater Acoustics, Seafloor Topography, Underwater Volcanoes and Earthquakes, Gravity and Magnetics, Structure of Earth Interior, Numerical Modeling, Computational Sciences, Rock Magnetics, Assistive Technology

Bibliography 
 Lee, SM (2008) 0.1 Grams of Hope (0.1그램의 희망) Random House Korea. 341 pages.

References

1962 births
Living people
Seoul National University
Massachusetts Institute of Technology alumni
Seoul National University alumni
Scientists with disabilities
Scientific computing researchers